Réka Opavszky (born 23 August 2003) is a Hungarian sprint canoeist.

She competed at the 2021 ICF Canoe Sprint World Championships, winning a silver medal in the C-4 500 m distance.

References

External links

2003 births
Living people
Hungarian female canoeists
ICF Canoe Sprint World Championships medalists in Canadian
21st-century Hungarian women